The Raubold House is a historic house on Chesham Road in Harrisville, New Hampshire.  Completed in 1901, it is a good example of a vernacular house built for immigrant mill workers.  The house was listed on the National Register of Historic Places in 1988.

Description and history
It is a two-story wood-frame structure, with a clapboarded exterior and gabled roof with short returns. A covered porch extends across the south and east facades, supported by turned posts.

This house was built in 1901. It is a modest worker's house of a sort typically built in the town for immigrants working either in the mills or at one of the local summer resort estates.  Robert Raubold, its first owner, was a German immigrant who had jobs both at the Cheshire Mills and at Aldworth Manor.  The next owner was his nephew, Alfred Dietze, who worked as a gardener at a Dublin estate.  A later owner was the stationmaster at Harrisville's railroad station.

See also
National Register of Historic Places listings in Cheshire County, New Hampshire

References

Houses on the National Register of Historic Places in New Hampshire
Houses completed in 1901
Houses in Harrisville, New Hampshire
National Register of Historic Places in Cheshire County, New Hampshire